The Urban Electric Supply Company Limited (UESCo) was a British electricity industry holding company that operated from 1898 until the nationalisation of the electricity supply industry in 1948. It controlled directly, or indirectly through its subsidiaries, electricity undertakings throughout Britain.

History 
The company was founded in 1898 for the purpose of obtaining Parliamentary powers to operate electric light and tramway undertakings in England, Wales and Scotland. By 1901 powers had been obtained to construct electricity systems in the following towns, given together with the projected cost of these works:

In addition to electric light supplies there were two electric tramways being developed: Camborne and Redruth (£40,000) and Glossop (£50,000). The construction of all these systems was undertaken by Edmundsons Electricity Corporation Limited.

The Urban Electric Company raised capital in June 1901 by issuing £500,000 of shares. Further capital was raised by the subsequent issue of shares: £650,000 in July 1905; £640,000 in June 1923; and £250,000 of £1 ordinary shares in 1930.

In 1905 Bishop Auckland was no longer controlled by the company but the Caterham and Newbury undertakings had been added to the Urban Electric Supply Company's portfolio.

In 1923 the company controlled the following undertakings, these were generally small scale, the installed generating capacity, electricity sold and operating surplus was:

In 1930 the capital raised by the issue of shares was used to acquire control of the following electricity undertakings:

 Bodmin Electric Light and Supply Company Limited
 East Cornwall Electricity Supply Company Limited 
 Looe Electricity Company Limited
 North Cornwall Ice and Cold Storage Company Limited (Padstow)
 Wadebridge and District Electric Supply Company Limited
 Liskeard Gas and Electricity Company Limited
 Launceston and District Electric Supply Company Limited

Subsidiary companies 
The Cornwall Electric Power Company Limited was a subsidiary company, which operated power stations at Hayle (8.80 MW in 1923, 32.5 MW in 1939) and Carn Brea (900 kW in 1923).

In 1931 the world price of tin suffered a serious fall. This had an impact on the Cornwall Electric Company which was dependent on tin mines for the bulk of its income. There was a drop of 4 GWh in electricity supply, which reduced the income from £9,250 to £7,500.  

In 1934 the Urban Electric Supply Company acquired another subsidiary, the East Anglian Electric Supply Company Limited. The area supplied by the East Anglian company had an additional 134 miles of high voltage and 80 miles of low voltage distribution mains.

Post-war operations 
By 1946 the only generating station operated by the Urban Electric Supply Company was the Hawick undertaking, with an output of 1,888 MWh. The Cornwall Electric Power Company Limited operated Hayle power station, output 142,868 MWh; and the East Anglian Electric Supply Company operated power stations at Cromer, output 62.9 MWh; and Southwold, output 392 kWh.

Nationalisation 
The Urban Electric Supply Company was abolished on 31 March 1948 under the terms of the Electricity Act 1947 which nationalised the British electricity supply industry. The company's power stations and electricity transmission systems were vested in the British Electricity Authority. The local distribution systems and the electricity supply functions were vested in the various geographical Electricity Boards.

Financial 
The net profit from the company's operations was:

Key people 
The board of directors in 1901 was:

 Francis Edward Gripper (Chairman)
 Edmund Charrington
 Herbert Brent Grotrian
 William Page
 John Cuthbert Wigham

Subsequent Chairmen were:

 Edmund Charrington, 1905
 Philip Debell Tuckett, 1921–1933
 Sir Holberry Mensforth, 1935 (b. 1871, d. 1951)
 Wade Hampton Hayes, 1940 (b. 1879, d. 1956)

See also 

 List of pre-nationalisation UK electric power companies
 Timeline of the UK electricity supply industry
 List of power stations in England
 Electric Supply Corporation Limited

References 

Defunct electric power companies of the United Kingdom
Electric power companies of England
Electric power infrastructure in England
Energy companies disestablished in 1948